Pandora: Beneath the Paradise is an ongoing South Korean television series starring Lee Ji-ah, Lee Sang-yoon, Jang Hee-jin, Park Ki-woong, and Bong Tae-gyu. It premiered on tvN on March 11, 2023, and airs every Saturday and Sunday at 21:10 (KST). It is also available for streaming on Disney+ in selected regions.

Synopsis
The series tells the story of Hong Tae-ra (Lee Ji-ah) rising to the position of first lady in order to protect her beloved family, after completely forgetting her past memory, and to punish those who took control of her fate and shaken her.

Cast

Main
 Lee Ji-ah as Hong Tae-ra
 Chaerin as young Hong Tae-ra / Oh Young
 Pyo Jae-hyun's wife who is a top-class woman who has no regrets about wealth and fame. She lost both her parents in an unfortunate accident in France, and lost her memories as a result of the accident.
 Lee Sang-yoon as Pyo Jae-hyun
 Hong Tae-ra's husband, who is the chairman of the IT company Hatch and a strong candidate for the next presidential election.
 Jang Hee-jin as Go Hae-soo
 Ha Yul-ri as young Go Hae-soo
 Jang Do-jin's wife, and the main anchor of YBC.
 Park Ki-woong as Jang Do-jin
 Go Hae-soo's husband, and the management representative of the IT company Hatch.
 Bong Tae-gyu as Gu Sang-chan
 The research director of the IT company Hatch.

Supporting

People around Hong Tae-ra and Pyo Jae-hyun
 Han Soo-yeon as Hong Yu-ra
 A fashion entrepreneur and CEO of fashion brand Lapin, who is Hong Tae-ra's older sister and only family member.
 Kim Si-woo as Pyo Ji-woo
 Pyo Jae-hyun and Hong Tae-ra's daughter.

People around Go Hae-soo and Jang Do-jin
 Cha Kwang-soo as Go Tae-seon
 Go Hae-soo's deceased father, who is a 25th presidential election and a former Minister of Strategy and Finance.
 Kim Su-jeong as Gong Ja-young
 Go Hae-soo's mother.
 Kim Ra-on as Jang Leo
 Jang Do-jin and Go Hae-soo's son.

People at Hanul Psychiatric Hospital
 Shim So-young as Kim Seon-deok
 Director of Hanul Psychiatric Hospital.
 Gong Jeong-hwan as Jo Gyu-tae
 The head of Hanul Psychiatric Hospital.

People at Keumjo Group
 Ahn Nae-sang as Jang Geum-mo
 Jang Do-jin's father, and the chairman of the Keumjo Group.
 Kyeon Mi-ri as Min Young-hwi
 Jang Do-jin's mother, and the hostess of the Keumjo Group.
 Hong Woo-jin as Jang Gyo-jin
 Jang Do-jin's older brother and the successor of the Keumjo Group.
 Seong Chang-hoon as Eom Sang-bae
 Jang Geum-mo's right-hand man.
 Song Ah-kyung as Eun Yon-sil
 A butler who helps Min Young-hwi.

Others
Jung Jae-seong as Han Kyung-rok
 The leader of the People's Party and 29th presidential candidate.
 Kwon Hyun-bin as Cha Pil-seung
 A bodyguard who assists Hong Tae-ra.
 Go Yun-bin as Yang Se-jin
 The chief researcher of Hatch.
 Heo Jae-ho as Oh Young-guk
 Pyo Jae-hyun's Election campaign head of election countermeasures headquarters.
 Han Kang-ho as Chairman Chung
 Pyo Jae-hyun's Election campaign committee chairman.
 Jang Won-young as Bong Woo-ri
 Pyo Jae-hyun's Election campaign head of the department in charge of Tae-ra's outfit and image at the election camp.
 Ahn Tae-hwan as Park Jun-ho
 Journalist at YBC.
 Go Han-min as Song PD
 PD of the YBC press department.

Production

Release
On February 16, 2023, tvN released the stills of Lee Ji-ah. On February 21, the stills of Lee Sang-yoon was released. A day later, the family photo stills featuring Lee Ji-ah, Lee Sang-yoon, and Kim Si-woo was released. The teaser videos were released on January 27, February 2, February 10, and February 17.

Viewership

References

External links
  
 
 
 

TVN (South Korean TV channel) television dramas
Korean-language television shows
Television series by Studio Dragon
Television series by Chorokbaem Media
Television series about revenge
Television shows written by Kim Soon-ok
2023 South Korean television series debuts

South Korean thriller television series